Euro-Mediterranean University may refer to

 Euro-Mediterranean University of Slovenia
 Euro-Mediterranean University of Morocco